Grisignano di Zocco is a town in the province of Vicenza, Veneto, Italy. It is south of E70.

It is an important traffic node because of the local highway junction, that allows businesses within a  radius access to the Autostrada A4, the main highway in Northern Italy crossing it west to east.

It is also famous for the "Fiera del Soco", a centuries-old fair.

Sources

(Google Maps)

Cities and towns in Veneto